JP is the third studio album by American singer Jesse Powell. It was released by Silas Records and MCA Records on March 27, 2001 in the United States.

Critical reception

Allmusic editor Alex Henderson found that Powell continues "to improve and grow. It isn't that JP is a departure from his two previous albums, Jesse Powell (1995) and 'Bout It (1998) – Powell's specialty is still romantic urban contemporary, and even though a few of the tunes are mildly funky, ballads and slow jams are what ultimately define JP. The thing that makes JP a step forward for the neo-soulster is the quality of the writing [..,] Powell, however, has genuine talent. The Midwesterner has an impressive range (four octaves, to be exact), and his attractive phrasing sometimes reminds you of former Klique vocalist Howard Huntsberry. Again, JP isn't a masterpiece, but it's an enjoyable step forward for Powell."

Track listing

Notes
 denotes co-producer

Charts

References

2001 albums
Jesse Powell albums
Albums produced by Tim & Bob